Sophie Thompson (born 20 January 1962) is a British actress who has worked in film, television and theatre. A six-time Olivier Award nominee, she won the 1999 Olivier Award for Best Actress in a Musical for the London revival of Into the Woods. Her other nominations were for Wildest Dreams (1994), Company (1996), Clybourne Park (2011)  Guys and Dolls (2016) and 'Present Laughter' (2019).

Thompson's film appearances include Four Weddings and a Funeral (1994), Persuasion (1995), Emma (1996), Dancing at Lughnasa (1998), Gosford Park (2001) and Harry Potter and the Deathly Hallows – Part 1 (2010). Her television roles include playing Stella Crawford in the BBC soap opera EastEnders (2006–2007) and Rosemary Piper in the ITV soap opera Coronation Street (2018).

Life and work

Early life, training and early career 
Thompson was born 20 January 1962 in London, and is the daughter of actress Phyllida Law, the presenter of the first TV show broadcast on BBC Two, Play School, and actor Eric Thompson, the writer–narrator of the popular children's television series The Magic Roundabout on BBC One in the 1960s. She is the younger sister of actress and screenwriter Emma Thompson.

She made her television debut at the age of 15, starring in the BBC adaptation of the Alison Uttley classic A Traveller in Time, opposite Simon Gipps-Kent, before going on to study at the Bristol Old Vic Theatre School.

In 1979, Thompson made her professional theatre debut at the age of 17 in the play The Schoolmistress by Arthur Wing Pinero at the Royal Exchange in Manchester.

Film 
Big-screen roles include Four Weddings and a Funeral, Eat Pray Love,  Emma, Dancing at Lughnasa, Gosford Park, Fat Slags, Relative Values and Morris: A Life with Bells On. In 2010, Thompson appeared in Harry Potter and the Deathly Hallows.

Television 
Thompson starred alongside popular British comedians Alan Davies, in Jonathan Creek, and Lee Evans in So What Now? She has also appeared in Persuasion,Midsomer Murders, The Case-Book of Sherlock Holmes,A Harlot's Progress, and the TV movie Magnolia. She played Miss Bartlett in Andrew Davies' 2007 adaptation of E.M. Forster's A Room with a View and also appeared in the last episode of series 4 of Doc Martin.

Thompson played the role of child abuser Stella Crawford in the BBC One soap opera EastEnders. She came into the show as Phil Mitchell's lawyer and they gradually developed a romantic link. Stella later became jealous of Phil's relationship with his son Ben and began to emotionally and physically abuse him, becoming one of soap's most-hated villains. Thompson left EastEnders on 20 July 2007, after the exposure of Stella's evil ways on her wedding day led to the character's suicide. She won the "inside soap Best bitch award" for her portrayal of Stella. In 2009, Thompson appeared in the BBC One comedy series Big Top. During 2012, Thompson appeared in Love Life and Lightfields, both of which were aired on ITV. In the same year she also appeared in a Keaton Henson's music video for a song called You Don't Know How Lucky You Are. Her most recent television credits include Detectorists, Professor Branestawm, A Gert Lush Christmas, Jericho and Coronation Street (2018).

Thompson competed in Celebrity MasterChef in 2014, beating Jodie Kidd and Charley Boorman in the final.

Theatre 
She played Ophelia in the Renaissance Theatre Company production of Hamlet in 1988 in Birmingham, later touring England with the production. Directed by Sir Derek Jacobi, it starred her future brother-in-law Kenneth Branagh as Hamlet, Richard Easton as Claudius and Dearbhla Molloy as Gertrude. A film documentary, Discovering Hamlet,  detailing the process of producing and rehearsing the play was released in 1990. A DVD version was released in 2010.

In 1996, Thompson appeared as Amy in Sam Mendes' acclaimed Donmar Warehouse revival of Company, receiving an Olivier Award nomination for her performance. Her performance of the Baker's Wife in the Donmar's revival of Into the Woods garnered her the 1999 Olivier Award for Best Actress in a Musical.

She played Kathy/Bev in Dominic Cooke's 2011 production of Clybourne Park at The Royal Court, which transferred to The Wyndhams.  Thompson received an Olivier nomination for Best Actress.

Thompson's recent theatre credits include the role of Mrs Hardcastle in She Stoops To Conquer at the National Theatre, directed by Jamie Lloyd, and also the part of Doctor Mathilde von Zahnd in Josie Rourke's production of The Physicists at the Donmar.

Writing 
In 2015, Thompson's recipe book, My Family Kitchen, was published, and her first children's book, Zoo Boy, was published in 2016.

Personal life
In 1995, Thompson married actor Richard Lumsden; the couple separated in 2015. They have two sons: Ernie James Lumsden born in 1997, and Walter Ernest Thompson, born in 2000.

Thompson has been an active charity ambassador over the years, for Dan's Fund For Burns; she also ran the 2010 Marathon for CINI, a charity supporting vulnerable families in India, and 24th Tottenham, a London-based group for children and young adults with special needs.

Filmography

Film
{| class="wikitable"
|-
! Year
! Title
! Role
! Notes
|-
|1982 ||The Missionary ||Mission Girl ||
|-
|1991 ||Twenty-One || Francesca ||
|-
|1994 ||Four Weddings and a Funeral || Lydia, the Bride – Wedding Two ||
|-
|1995 ||Persuasion || Mary Musgrove ||
|-
|1996 ||Emma || Miss Bates ||
|-
|1998 ||Dancing at Lughnasa || Rose Mundy ||
|-
|2000 ||Relative Values || Dora Moxton ||
|-
|2001 ||Gosford Park ||Dorothy ||
|-
|2002 ||Nicholas Nickleby || Miss Lacreevy ||
|-
|2004 ||Fat Slags || Tracey ||
|-
|2009 ||Morris: A Life with Bells On || Glenda ||
|-
|rowspan=2|2010 ||Eat Pray Love ||Corella ||
|-
|Harry Potter and the Deathly Hallows – Part 1 ||Mafalda Hopkirk ||
|-
|2011 ||Monte Carlo || Auction Bidder 2 ||
|-
|rowspan=2|2014 ||That Day We Sang ||Dorothy ||
|-
|Mohammed || Emily || Short film
|-
|2015 || Viking || Cathy || Short film
|-
|2018 || The Importance of Being Earnest ||Lady Bracknell ||
|-
|rowspan=3|2019 || A Disappearance ||Dame Alvera || Short film
|-
|Tales from the Lodge || Emma ||
|-
|Present Laughter ||Monica Reed ||
|}

TelevisionA Traveller in Time (1978) ... Penelope; 5 episodesHammer House of Horror (1980) ... First Girl in "Guardian of the Abyss";Casualty (1987) ... Judy Wilson in "Cross Fingers"; 1 episodeBoon (1991) ... Vicky 'Mouthpiece' in "Help Me Make It Through the Night"; 1 episodeThe Casebook of Sherlock Holmes (1992) ... Agatha in "The Master Blackmailer"Comedy Playhouse (1993) ... Val in "The Complete Guide to Relationships"Performance (1994) ... Gillian Player in "Message for Posterity"Nelson's Column (1994–1995) ... Clare PriddyMr. Bean (1995) ... Girlfriend "Torvill and Bean"; 1 episodeThe Railway Children (2000) ... Mrs PerksSo What Now? (2001) ... HeatherJonathan Creek (2003) ... Dorothy Moon in "Angel Hair"; 1 episodeThe Young Visiters (2003) ... Bessie ToppMidsomer Murders (2006) ... April Gooding in "Dead Letters"; 1 episodeMagnolia (2006) ... Marjorie ForsythA Harlot's Progress (2006) ... Jane HogarthDoctors (2006) ... Rachel Barton in "Rabbitgate"; 1 episodeEastEnders (2006–2007) ... Stella CrawfordA Room with a View (2007) ... Charlotte BartlettBig Top (2009) ... Aunty HelenMay Contain Nuts (2009) ... Sarah McDonaldDoc Martin (2009) ... TashaAgatha Christie's Poirot (2010) ... Mrs Reynolds in "Hallowe’en Party"Whistle and I'll Come to You (2010) ... Carol, the hotel proprietorLove Life (2012) ... PennyLightfields (2013) ... LornaDeath in Paradise (2014) ... Angela ; 1 episodeInside No. 9 (2014) ... Jan in "Last Gasp"Detectorists (2014–2015, 2017) ... SheilaCelebrity MasterChef (2014) ... Herself/series winnerThe Incredible Adventures of Professor Branestawm (2014) ... AggieHarry Hill in Professor Branestawm Returns (2015) ... AggieA Gert Lush Christmas (2015) ... Sue ColmanBounty Hunters (2017) ... FionaRatburger (2017) ... Miss MaxwellCoronation Street (2018) ... Rosemary Piper, Recurring roleGhosts (2019 TV series) (2019) ... Bunny Beg-Chetwynd Sandylands (2020) ... Jeannie SwallowsFeel Good (2020) ... MaggieSex Education (2021) ... Carol IglehartThe Flatshare (2022) ... Katherine

TheatreHamlet ... Ophelia; Renaissance Theatre Company; 1988As You Like It ... Rosalind; Royal Shakespeare Company; 1989–1990  All's Well That Ends Well  ... Helena; Royal Shakespeare Company; 1992–1993  Wildest Dreams ... Royal Shakespeare Company; 1993–1994 (Olivier nomination) Company ... Amy; Donmar/Albery; 1996 (Olivier nomination)  Into the Woods ... The Baker's Wife; Donmar; 1998–1999 (Olivier Award)  Measure For Measure ... Isabella; Globe Theatre, London; 2004  Female of the Species ... London; 2008 (Theatre goers choice award)  Clybourne Park ... Bev/Kathy; Royal Court Theatre, London; 2010 (Olivier Nomination, Evening Standard nomination) She Stoops to Conquer ... Mrs Hardcastle; National Theatre, London; 2012  Guys and Dolls ... Miss Adelaide; Chichester Festival Theatre, Tour and Savoy Theatre, London; 2015–2016 (Olivier nomination)The Importance of Being Earnest ... Lady Bracknell; Vaudeville Theatre, London; 2018Present Laughter'' ... Monica Reed; The Old Vic, London; 2019 (Olivier nomination)

References

External links
 

1962 births
20th-century English actresses
21st-century English actresses
Actresses from London
Alumni of Bristol Old Vic Theatre School
Anglo-Scots
English child actresses
English film actresses
English musical theatre actresses
English people of Scottish descent
English Shakespearean actresses
English soap opera actresses
English stage actresses
English television actresses
Living people
Laurence Olivier Award winners
Outstanding Performance by a Cast in a Motion Picture Screen Actors Guild Award winners
Reality cooking competition winners
Royal Shakespeare Company members